The Ferrovie dello Stato Italiane (FS; Italian State Railways) Class 310 (Italian: Gruppo 310), formerly Rete Mediterranea Class 380, was a 0-6-0 steam locomotive; they were the first Italian as-built compound locomotives.

Design and construction
After modifying six of the pre-existing Class 255 to a compound arrangement as an experiment, with positive results, the Ufficio d'Arte di Torino of the Rete Mediterranea designed a two-cylinder compound locomotive meant for mixed service; this design also saw the beginning of the adoption of the Walschaerts valve gear on Italian locomotives.

These locomotives were built between 1894 and 1901 by Ernesto Breda and MÁVAG.

Service
The Class 310, while an important step in Italian locomotive design, was not a thoroughly successful design; the unique cut-off command for both cylinders made it difficult to equalize the work being done, the starting valve design did not prove entirely successful, and the proportions of the cylinders were also less than optimal. The need to obviate these inconvenients led to the development of the more successful Class 320.

The Class 310 locomotives served on both passenger and freight trains on secondary lines for their whole career; the last units survived till the early 1930s around Asti, but were withdrawn soon after. No locomotive survived into preservation.

References

 
 

310
0-6-0 locomotives
Compound locomotives
Breda locomotives
Standard gauge locomotives of Italy
Railway locomotives introduced in 1894